Sade may refer to:

People
 Marquis de Sade (1740–1814), French aristocrat, writer, and libertine
 Sade (singer) (born 1959, Helen Folasade Adu), British Nigerian musician and lead singer of the eponymous band
 Sade Baderinwa (born 1969), WABC-TV Eyewitness News correspondent and anchor

Arts, entertainment, and media

Films
 Sade (film) (2000), a French film starring Daniel Auteuil as the Marquis de Sade

Music
 Sade (band), a 1982 British smooth jazz band headed by the singer Sade
 "Sade", a song from the album Duotones (1986) by Kenny G, composed as a tribute to the band Sade
 "Sade", a single from the album Gold (2016) by Adekunle Gold

Other uses
 Sade, Solapur district, a village in Maharashtra, India
 Sadeh (disambiguation)
 Tsade, a letter in several Semitic languages
 Società Adriatica di Elettricità, bought by Montedison in the 1960s.